Hanover Football Club was a football club from the city of Edinburgh.

History

The club was formed in 1875, and was a founder member of the Edinburgh Football Association later in the year.  The first fixture recorded for the club was a 1–1 draw with 3rd Edinburgh Rifle Volunteers F.C. on the Meadows in September 1875.

Hanover was one of the four sides which took part in the first Edinburgh FA Cup, losing to the 3rd E.R.V. in its one tie.

Hanover's first entry to the Scottish Cup was in 1876–77, losing to Edinburgh Thistle.  The club improved its playing strength for 1877–78, retaining the previous season's players and developing a large membership, making it "one of the most promising of the district clubs", and although not as physically strong as the other side, considered a speedy side.  The club's work was rewarded with a win in the first round of the Scottish Cup, 1–0 against the Thistle, and only going out to the strong Hibernian F.C. in a replay. 

However that Cup win would be the club's only win in the Scottish Cup, despite entering every year until 1881–82.  The club had more success in the Edinburgh Cup, regularly reaching the fourth round, although it had only one more semi-final appearance (in 1878–79).  

The club did reach one final; in the 1878–79 President's Cup, a one-off tournament for a trophy presented by the President of the Edinburgh FA.  Hanover brought in four players from Govan F.C. in order to gain an advantage in the final, which led to a protest from opponents Heart of Midlothian F.C., and the game only went ahead after the regulations were checked and there found to be no rule against it.  The match, at the Powderhall Stadium, ended 4–4, and Hearts scored the winner in extra-time.

By 1882 the club had fallen behind the two big Edinburgh clubs, and for a friendly with Hearts could only muster 10 players, and even that was only achieved by borrowing two from the short-lived Elgin club of Stockbridge Park.  The club's last competitive fixture was a defeat to Bo'ness F.C. in the Edinburgh Consolation Cup in 1884; this was a new tournament for clubs eliminated in the earlier rounds of the Edinburgh Cup.

Colours

The club played in light blue and white.

Ground

The club originally played at the East Meadows, in common with all of the early Edinburgh clubs.  From 1880–81 it played at the Royal Gymnasium, although it played its final Scottish Cup tie with Brunswick F.C. at Tynecastle.

External links

Scottish Cup results
Edinburgh Cup results

References

Football clubs in Scotland
Defunct football clubs in Scotland
Association football clubs established in 1875
Association football clubs disestablished in 1884
1875 establishments in Scotland
1884 disestablishments in Scotland
Football in Edinburgh